Muhammad Usman (born: 13 October 1985) is a Pakistani-born cricketer who plays for the United Arab Emirates national cricket team. He made his first-class debut for the United Arab Emirates against the Netherlands in the 2015–17 ICC Intercontinental Cup on 21 January 2016. He made his List A debut for the UAE against the Netherlands in the 2015–17 ICC World Cricket League Championship on 27 January 2016. He made his Twenty20 International debut against the Netherlands on 3 February 2016. He made his One Day International debut against Scotland on 14 August 2016 in the 2015–17 ICC World Cricket League Championship.

In April 2017, he scored his maiden first-class century in round five of the 2015–17 ICC Intercontinental Cup against Papua New Guinea.

In January 2018, he was named in the United Arab Emirates' squad for the 2018 ICC World Cricket League Division Two tournament. In August 2018, he was named in the United Arab Emirates' squad for the 2018 Asia Cup Qualifier tournament. In December 2018, he was named in the United Arab Emirates' team for the 2018 ACC Emerging Teams Asia Cup.

In September 2019, he was named in the United Arab Emirates' squad for the 2019 ICC T20 World Cup Qualifier tournament in the UAE. He was the leading run-scorer for the UAE in the tournament, with 192 runs in eight matches. In December 2020, he was one of ten cricketers to be awarded with a year-long full-time contract by the Emirates Cricket Board. The following month, in the UAE's first fixture against Ireland, Usman scored his first century in an ODI match.

References

External links
 

1985 births
Living people
Emirati cricketers
United Arab Emirates One Day International cricketers
United Arab Emirates Twenty20 International cricketers
Cricketers from Lahore
Pakistani emigrants to the United Arab Emirates
Pakistani expatriate sportspeople in the United Arab Emirates